Lingzhi, Ganoderma lingzhi, also known as reishi, is a polypore fungus ("bracket fungus") native to East Asia belonging to the genus Ganoderma.

Its reddish brown varnished kidney-shaped cap with bands and peripherally inserted stem gives it a distinct fan-like appearance.  When fresh, the lingzhi is soft, cork-like, and flat. It lacks gills on its underside, and instead releases its spores via fine pores (80–120 μm) in yellow colors.

The lingzhi mushroom is used in traditional Chinese medicine. There is insufficient evidence to indicate that consuming lingzhi mushrooms or their extracts has any effect on human health or diseases.

In nature, it grows at the base and stumps of deciduous trees, especially that of the maple.  Only two or three out of 10,000 such aged trees will have lingzhi growth, and therefore its wild form is rare.  Lingzhi may be cultivated on hardwood logs, sawdust, or woodchips.

Taxonomy and ecology 
Lingzhi, also known as reishi from its Japanese pronunciation, is the ancient "mushroom of immortality", revered for over 2,000 years.  Uncertainty exists about which Ganoderma species was most widely utilized as lingzhi mushroom in ancient times, and likely a few different common species were considered interchangeable. However, in the 16th century Chinese herbal compendium, the Bencao Gangmu (1578), a number of different lingzhi-like mushrooms were used for different purposes and defined by color. No exact current species can be attached to these ancient lingzhi for certain, but according to Dai et al. (2017), as well as other researchers, and based on molecular work, red lingzhi is most likely to be Ganoderma lingzhi (Sheng H. Wu, Y. Cao & Y.C. Dai, 2012). This is the species that is most widely found in Chinese herb shops today, and the fruiting bodies are widely cultivated in China and shipped to many other countries. About 7-10 other Ganoderma species are also sold in some shops, but have different Chinese and Latin names, and are considered different in their activity and functions. The differences are based on concentrations of triterpenes such as ganoderic acid and its derivatives, which vary widely among species. Research on the genus is ongoing, but a number of recent phylogenetic analyses have been published in the last number of years.

Nomenclature 
Petter Adolf Karsten named the genus Ganoderma in 1881. English botanist William Curtis gave the fungus its first binomial name, Boletus lucidus, in 1781. The lingzhi's botanical names have Greek and Latin roots. Ganoderma derives from the Greek ganos (γανος; "brightness"), and derma (δερμα; "skin; together; shining skin"). The specific epithet, lingzhi, comes from Chinese, meaning "divine mushroom."

With the advent of genome sequencing, the genus Ganoderma has undergone taxonomic reclassification. Prior to genetic analyses of fungi, classification was done according to morphological characteristics such as size and color. The internal transcribed spacer region of the Ganoderma genome is considered to be a standard barcode marker.

Varieties 
It was once thought that Ganoderma lingzhi generally occurred in two growth forms: a large, sessile, specimen with a small or nonexistent stalk, found in North America, and a smaller specimen with a long, narrow stalk, found mainly in the tropics. However, recent molecular evidence has identified the former, stalkless, form as a distinct species called  G. sessile, a name given to North American specimens by William Alfonso Murrill in 1902.

Environmental conditions play a substantial role in the lingzhi's manifest morphological characteristics. For example, elevated carbon dioxide levels result in stem elongation in lingzhi. Other formations include antlers without a cap, which may also be related to carbon dioxide levels. The three main factors that influence fruit body development morphology are light, temperature, and humidity. While water and air quality play a role in fruit body development morphology, they do so to a lesser degree.

Habitat 
Ganoderma lingzhi is found in East Asia growing as a parasite or saprotroph on a variety of trees. Ganoderma curtisii and Ganoderma ravenelii are the closest relatives of the lingzhi mushroom in North America.

In the wild, lingzhi grows at the base and stumps of deciduous trees, especially that of the maple. Only two or three out of 10,000 such aged trees will have lingzhi growth, and therefore it is extremely rare in its natural form. Today, lingzhi is effectively cultivated on hardwood logs or sawdust/woodchips.

History 

In the chronicles of Shiji 1st c. BC from Sima Qian, is attested  the initial use of nearby separately  related words with «芝 zhi — woody mushroom» and «靈 ling — divine spirit» in the poems of Emperor Wu of Han. Later, in the 1st c. CE through the poetry of  Ban Gu, occurred the first combination of the hieroglyphs «靈芝» together into a single word, in an ode dedicated to «Lingzhi».

Since ancient times, Taoist temples were called «the abode of mushrooms» and according to their mystical teachings, the use of woody mushrooms zhi (Ganoderma) or lingzhi «spirits mushroom», in particular making from it a concentrated decoction of hallucinogenic action, gave followers the opportunity to see spirits or become spirits themselves by receiving the magical energy of the immortals xians, located on the «fields of grace» in the heavenly «mushroom fields» zhi tian.

In the philosophical work Huainanzi, it is said about the lingzhi mushroom as the personification of nobility; from which shamans brewed  a psychedelic drink.

The Shennong bencao jing (Divine Farmer's Classic of Pharmaceutics) of c.200–250 CE, classifies zhi into six color categories, each of which is believed to benefit the qi, or "life force", in a different part of the body: qingzhi (青芝; "Green Mushroom") for the liver, chizhi (赤芝; "Red Mushroom") for the heart, huangzhi (黃芝; "Yellow Mushroom") for the spleen, baizhi (白芝; "White Mushroom") for the lungs, heizhi (黑芝; "Black Mushroom") for the kidneys, and zizhi (紫芝; "Purple Mushroom") for the Essence. Commentators identify the red chizhi, or danzhi (丹芝; "cinnabar mushroom"), as the lingzhi.

In taoist  treatise of Baopuzi from Ge Hong indicated the zhi-mushroom (lingzhi 靈芝) is used for immortality.

The (1596) Bencao Gangmu (Compendium of Materia Medica) has a Zhi (芝) category that includes six types of zhi (calling the green, red, yellow, white, black, and purple mushrooms of the Shennong bencao jing the liuzhi (六芝; "six mushrooms") and sixteen other fungi, mushrooms, and lichens, including mu'er (木耳; "wood ear"; "cloud ear fungus", Auricularia auricula-judae). The author Li Shizhen classified these six differently colored zhi as xiancao (仙草; "immortality herbs"), and described the effects of chizhi ("red mushroom"):

Stuart and Smith's classic study of Chinese herbology describes the zhi.

The Bencao Gangmu does not list lingzhi as a variety of zhi, but as an alternate name for the shi'er (石耳; "stone ear", Umbilicaria esculenta) lichen. According to Stuart and Smith,

In Chinese art, the lingzhi symbolizes great health and longevity, as depicted in the imperial Forbidden City and Summer Palace. It was a talisman for luck in the traditional culture of China, and the goddess of healing Guanyin is sometimes depicted holding a lingzhi mushroom.

Regional names

Chinese 
The Old Chinese name for lingzhi  was first recorded during the Han dynasty (206 BC – 9 AD). In the Chinese language,  is a compound. Fabrizio Pregadio notes, "The term zhi, which has no equivalent in Western languages, refers to a variety of supermundane substances often described as plants, fungi, or 'excrescences'."

Lingzhi has several synonyms. It is a [ruicao] felicitous plant."

Since both Chinese ling and zhi have multiple meanings, lingzhi has diverse English translations. Renditions include "[zhi] possessed of soul power", "Herb of Spiritual Potency" or "Mushroom of Immortality", "Numinous Mushroom", "divine mushroom", "divine fungus", "Magic Fungus", and "Marvelous Fungus".

English 
In English, lingzhi or ling chih (sometimes spelled "ling chi", using the French EFEO Chinese transcription) is a Chinese loanword. It is also commonly referred to as "reishi", which is loaned from Japanese.

The Oxford English Dictionary (OED) gives the definition, "The fungus Ganoderma lucidum (actually Ganoderma lingzhi (see Ganoderma lucidum for details), believed in China to confer longevity and used as a symbol of this on Chinese ceramic ware.", and identifies the etymology of the word as Chinese: líng, "divine" + zhī, "fungus". According to the OED, the earliest recorded usage of the Wade–Giles romanization ling chih is 1904, and of the Pinyin lingzhi is 1980.

In addition to the transliterated loanwords, English names include "glossy ganoderma" and "shiny polyporus".

Japanese 
The Japanese word  is a Sino-Japanese loanword deriving from the Chinese . Its modern Japanese kanji, is the shinjitai ("new character form") of the kyūjitai ("old character form"), . Synonyms for reishi are divided between Sino-Japanese borrowings and native Japanese coinages.

Korean 
The Korean name,  is also borrowed from, so a cognate with, the Chinese word . It is often called yeongjibeoseot ("yeongji mushroom") in Korean, with the addition of the native word  meaning "mushroom". South Korea produces over 25,000 tons of mushrooms every year.

Thai 
The Thai word  is a compound of the native word  meaning "mushroom" and the loanword  from the Chinese .

Vietnamese 
The Vietnamese language word  is a loanword from Chinese.

Uses

Clinical research and phytochemistry 

Ganoderma lucidum contains diverse phytochemicals, including triterpenes (ganoderic acids), which have a molecular structure similar to that of steroid hormones. It also contains phytochemicals found in fungal materials, including polysaccharides (such as beta-glucan), coumarin, mannitol, and alkaloids. Sterols isolated from the mushroom include ganoderol, ganoderenic acid, ganoderiol, ganodermanontriol, lucidadiol, and ganodermadiol.

A 2015 Cochrane database review found insufficient evidence to justify the use of G. lucidum as a first-line cancer treatment. It stated that G. lucidum may have "benefit as an alternative adjunct to conventional treatment in consideration of its potential of enhancing tumour response and stimulating host immunity." Existing studies do not support the use of G. lucidum for treatment of risk factors of cardiovascular disease in people with type 2 diabetes mellitus.

Folk medicine 

Because of its bitter taste, lingzhi is traditionally prepared as a hot water extract product for use in folk medicine. Thinly sliced or pulverized lingzhi (either fresh or dried) is added to boiling water which is then reduced to a simmer, covered, and left for 2 hours. The resulting liquid is dark and fairly bitter in taste. The red lingzhi is often more bitter than the black. The process is sometimes repeated to increase the concentration. Alternatively, it can be used as an ingredient in a formula decoction, or used to make an extract (in liquid, capsule, or powder form).

Other uses 
Lingzhi is commercially manufactured and sold. Since the early 1970s, most lingzhi is cultivated. Lingzhi can grow on substrates such as sawdust, grain, and wood logs. After formation of the fruiting body, lingzhi is most commonly harvested, dried, ground, and processed into tablets or capsules to be directly ingested or made into tea or soup. Other lingzhi products include processed fungal mycelia or spores. Lingzhi is also used to create mycelium bricks, mycelium furniture, and leather-like products.

See also
Medicinal fungi

References 

Dietary supplements
Fungi described in 2012
Fungi of Asia
Fungi used in traditional Chinese medicine
Ganodermataceae
Medicinal fungi
Non-timber forest products
Fungi in cultivation